This is a list of notable musical works which use the whole tone scale.

Béla Bartók
Cantata Profana, b. 186–187
Concerto for Orchestra, fifth movement, b. 484
String Quartet No. 1, end of movement 3
String Quartet No. 4, first movement, b. 157–160
String Quartet No. 5 "The sequence of tonalities of the single sections [of the sonata form] produce the whole-tone scale". "In the first movement of the Fifth String Quartet...the tonalities of the individual sections form a complete whole-tone scale (B–C–D–E–F–G–B)."

Alban Berg
Violin Concerto
"Nacht" from Seven Early Songs

Hector Berlioz
Francs-Juges Overture

Ferruccio Busoni
An die Jugend for piano, the right hand part of the "Preludietto, Fughetta ed Esercizio" is based on the whole tone scale.

Frédéric Chopin
Prelude No. 19, mm. 43–44, in the bass, "while the melody moves down chromatically"

Alexander Dargomyzhsky
The Stone Guest, passage from act 3

Peter Maxwell Davies
Symphony No. 3, first movement, horns, between rehearsals P and Q

 Claude Debussy
Chansons de Bilitis
Children's Corner
Images for piano, No. 1
Jeux
La mer
Pelléas et Mélisande, act 4 scene 2
Prélude à l'après-midi d'un faune, b. 32–33, 35–36
Voiles from Préludes, Book 1

Edward Elgar
The Dream of Gerontius

Blair Fairchild
A Baghdad Lover, nine songs for bass and piano, Op. 25 (1911)

Mikhail Glinka
Ruslan and Lyudmila, near the end of the overture, in the finale to act 1, and in the act 4 chorus "Pogibnet! Pogibnet!"

The Human Abstract
"Holographic Sight"

Leoš Janáček
Sinfonietta (1926)

Sigfrid Karg-Elert
"Allegro burlesco" from the Sonatina exotique for piano

King Crimson
 "Fracture"
 One More Red Nightmare

Kraftwerk
 "Spacelab" (from The Man-Machine)

Franz Liszt
Fantasy and Fugue on the chorale "Ad nos, ad salutarem undam", for organ
Réminiscences de Don Juan

Olivier Messiaen
 Quartet for the End of Time (movement 6, "Danse of Fury, for the seven trumpets", cello part)

Lee Morgan
 "Our Man Higgins"

Wolfgang Amadeus Mozart
A Musical Joke

Giacomo Puccini
Madama Butterfly

Maurice Ravel
 Jeux d'Eau, page 1

Vladimir Rebikov
Une fête, No. 6
Les rêves

Nikolai Rimsky-Korsakov
 Piano Concerto, 1882, Allegro

Arnold Schoenberg
"Am Wegrand", Op. 6, no. 6
 Chamber Symphony No. 1
"Jesus bettelt", Op. 2, no. 2
Pelleas und Melisande
String Quartet No. 1

Franz Schubert
"Sanctus" from the Mass No. 6 in E major, D. 950

Sparks
"In the Future" from the album Indiscreet

Karlheinz Stockhausen
 Montag aus Licht, act 1, scene 6, "Das große Geweine", b. 879–881

Igor Stravinsky
L'Histoire du soldat

Heitor Villa-Lobos
Chôros No. 2
String Quartet No. 3, second movement (Molto Vivo)

Stevie Wonder
"You Are the Sunshine of My Life" (introduction)

Joe Hisaishi
"Les Aventuriers" from Piano Stories II – The Wind of Life, 1996

See also
 Impressionist music

References

Sources

 
 
 
 
 
 
 
 
 
 
 
 
 
 
 
 
 
 
 
 
 
 
 
 
 
 
 
 
 
 
 

Whole tone